Tovdal (historic: Lille Topdal) is a former municipality in the old Aust-Agder county in Norway. The  municipality existed from 1908 until its dissolution in 1967.  Tovdal municipality was made up of the valley surrounding the river Tovdalselva and since 1967 it has been a part of the present-day municipality of Åmli which is now in Agder county. The administrative centre of the municipality was the village of Hillestad where the Tovdal Church is located.

History
The parish of Lille Topdal was a part of the municipality of Åmli when civil municipalities were created in Norway on 1 January 1838 (see formannskapsdistrikt law). The municipality of Lille Topdal was established on 1 January 1908 when the municipality of Åmli was split into three separate municipalities: Lille Topdal (population: 389), Gjevedal (population: 590), and Åmli (population: 2,024). In 1922, the name of the municipality was changed from Lille Topdal to Tovdal. During the 1960s, there were many municipal mergers across Norway due to the work of the Schei Committee. On 1 January 1967, Tovdal (population: 161) was merged back into the municipality of Åmli. At the time of its dissolution, Tovdal was the smallest municipality in Norway by population.

Name
The name of the municipality comes from the Old Norse word . The first element  is the old river name, now the Tovdalselva.

Government
All municipalities in Norway, including Tovdal, are responsible for primary education (through 10th grade), outpatient health services, senior citizen services, unemployment and other social services, zoning, economic development, and municipal roads. The municipality was governed by a municipal council of elected representatives, which in turn elected a mayor.

Municipal council
The municipal council  of Tovdal was made up of 13 representatives that were elected to four year terms.  The party breakdown of the final municipal council was as follows:

See also
List of former municipalities of Norway

References

External links

Åmli
Former municipalities of Norway
1908 establishments in Norway
1967 disestablishments in Norway